Abbottabad is a military garrison town in the hills of the Hazara region in the Khyber Pakhtunkhwa province of Pakistan. It has a number of universities, colleges and schools, as well as other educational and vocational institutions.

The most prominent of them are the Roots Millennium Schools and Roots School System also widely known as Roots International.

List of educational institutions in Abbottabad
This is a list of educational institutions in the Abbottabad District.

 Abbottabad School & College of Sciences Abbottabad
 Abbottabad Public School (APS)
 Al-Imtiaz Academy
 Al-Noor Academic System (ALNAS) (Hasan Town - P.M.A Road)
 Aligarh Public School & College
 Army Burn Hall College (ABHC)
 Army Public College Kakul Campus (APC)
 Army Public School And College Section, FF centre (APSACS) 
 Aspire Schools Abbottabad
 Awaisia Puplic School, Nawansher, Abbottabad
 Banat Public School & Girls College
 Beaconhouse Hassan Town
 Beaconhouse Liaquat Road
 Bloom Hall Public School
 Bright Hall Education System Abbottabad
 The City School Abbottabad
 Comwave Institute Of Science & Information Technology
 Concept School of Learning
 Creations – Academy of Fine Arts Abbottabad
 The Creators School & College of Science and Commerce Abbottabad
 The Educators School
 Abbasi public school and college abottabad hazara kp pak

Fauji Foundation Model School Abbottabad
 The First Frontier School & College (FFNS)
 Gandhara Public School
 Government Commerce College & Management Abbottabad (GCMS)
 Government Girls' College#1 Abbottabad
 Government Girls' College#2 Abbottabad
 Government Girls' High School#1 Abbottabad
 Government Girls' High School#2 Abbottabad
 Government Girls' Higher Secondary School Comprehensive Abbottabad
 Government High School#1 Abbottabad
 Government High School#2 Abbottabad
 Government High School#3 Abbottabad
 Government High School#4 Abbottabad
 Green Valley Public High School – P.M.A. Road, Abbottabad
 Hazara Hills Academy – Abbottabad
 Iqra Academy Abbottabad
 Kingston School For Mentally Retarded Children Kehal Abbottabad
 Kingston School For Learning Disabilities, Abbottabad
 Kingston School for Autism Children Abbottabad
 Kingston School for Special Needs Children Abbottabad
 Lime Light Public School 
 Leaps Grammar School Narrian Campus
 Mangal Public School
 Modern School System
 Modern Age Public School
 The Muslim Education System
 Nakhlah Academy
 The Nice School and College
 Nishtar Public School, Nawanshehr
 Pakistan International Public School and College (PIPS)
 Pakistan Public Academy – Chinar Road, Abbottabad
 Pine Hills Public School
 Present Times Public School
 Progressive College of Sciences
 Red Roses Islamic Academy – Gulshan Iqbal Jhangi   
 Rahber Public School
 Shama Public High School Abbottabad – Nawanshehr
 Sikandria Public School – near Ilyasi Masjid Nawanshehr Choonakari
 Peace Public School
 Urban School & College Abbottabad
 Vertex School System Abbottabad
 Zawiya International Public School
 Siddique Public School Narrian Abbottabad.

Post-secondary schools

 Abbottabad University of Science and Technology
 Army Burn Hall College (ABHC)
 Ayub Medical College
 Ayub Teaching Hospital
 Ayub School of Nursing
 Ayub College of Dentistry
 Institute of Nuclear Medicine, Oncology and Radiotherapy
 COMSATS Abbottabad
 Emerson College of Technology
 Emerson Degree College of Commerce and Management
 Frontier Medical College
 Gate Way School and College, Abbottabad
 Government College Abbottabad for Boys
 Government College of Management Sciences Abbottabad
 Government College of Technology Abbottabad
 Government Post Graduate College, Abbottabad
 Government Post Graduate College Mandian, Abbottabad
 Institute of Cost & Management Accountants of Pakistan (ICMAP) 
 Kingston School for Deaf & Hearing Impaired Children – Kehal, Abbottabad
 Kingston School for Mentally Retarded Children – Kehal, Abbottabad
 Kingston  School for Physically Challenged & Visual Challenged Children – Kehal, Abbottabad 
 Mishwani's College of Commerce & Accountancy (MCCA) – D.Com., DBA, B.Com. & M. Com; affiliated with the University of Peshawar
 Muslim College of Management Sciences Abbottabad
 NIMS College of Medicine – pending approval for recognition from CJ SC following corruption allegations against PMDC officials
 Oregon Institute of Education Abbottabad
 Peace Group Of Colleges Abbottabad
 Punjab Group of Colleges, Abbottabad
 University of Engineering and Technology, Peshawar, Abbottabad campus
 University of Science and Technology Abbottabad
 Women Medical College – Awami Road, Nawanshehr

Military schools

 Army Physical Training School
 Army School of Music
 Pakistan Military Academy
 Regimental Training Centers of the Pakistan Army
 Army Medical Corps (AMC)
 Baloch Regiment (BR)
 Frontier Force Regiment (PIFFERS)

See also

 Education in Pakistan
 List of schools in Pakistan

References

Abbottabad
Abbottabad